Piedra Negra Airport,  is an airstrip just southwest of Curanipe, a Pacific coastal town  southwest of Pelluhue, in the Maule Region of Chile.

The runway has a rising slope to the northeast.

See also

Transport in Chile
List of airports in Chile

References

External links
OpenStreetMap - Piedra Negra
OurAirports - Piedra Negra
FallingRain - Piedra Negra Airport

Airports in Chile
Airports in Maule Region